Thirumangalam lies on the border of Anna Nagar in Chennai. Thirumangalam is on the border of Anna Nagar and often referred as Anna Nagar. The original Thirumangalam village lies on the boundary of Anna Nagar and Anna Nagar West. The old Thirumaniamman Temple is situated here.

Schools in thirumangalam 
Kendriya Vidyalaya, Anna Nagar

Malls in thirumangalam 
-VR Mall, Anna Nagar

Neighbourhoods in Chennai